Harold John Daub Jr. (born April 23, 1941) is an American lawyer and politician from Nebraska who served four terms in the United States House of Representatives and as the 48th Mayor of Omaha, Nebraska. In 2012, Daub was elected to the Board of Regents of the University of Nebraska system. He is a member of the Republican Party.

Background
Born at Fort Bragg, near Fayetteville, North Carolina, where his father was stationed in the military, Daub grew up in North Omaha. He graduated from Benson High School before receiving his B.S. from Washington University in St. Louis, in 1963, and his J.D. from the University of Nebraska–Lincoln College of Law, Lincoln, Nebraska in 1966. He served in the United States Army as an infantry captain from 1966 to 1968 in Korea. Daub is a Distinguished Eagle Scout. Daub settled in Omaha, where he went into private practice of law.

Political career
After moving to Omaha, Daub became active in the Republican Party. He ran for the United States House of Representatives in the Omaha-based 2nd congressional district in 1978, losing to incumbent Democrat John J. Cavanaugh III. Cavanaugh declined to run for re-election in 1980 and Daub ran for the seat again, defeating Democrat Richard Fellman.  Daub was reelected three times, in 1982, 1984, and 1986.

In March 1987, Nebraska's senior U.S. Senator Edward Zorinsky, a Democrat, died of a heart attack and Governor Kay A. Orr appointed businessman David Karnes to fill the seat. Daub challenged Karnes in the Republican primary for election to a full term in the Senate in 1988, but lost by nine points to Karnes, who then lost the general election to former Democratic Governor Bob Kerrey. In 1990, Daub challenged the state's other Democratic senator, J. James Exon, for reelection, easily winning the Republican nomination, but losing the general election by a substantial margin to Exon.

In 1995, Daub won a special election for Mayor of Omaha following the resignation of Mayor P.J. Morgan, and was narrowly elected to a full term in 1997, both times defeating city councilwoman Brenda Council. In 2001, he was defeated for reelection by insurance executive Mike Fahey in a close race. Daub then served as a member of the Social Security Advisory Board from 2002 to 2006 and joined Missouri-based law firm Blackwell Sanders Peper Martin LLP (now Husch Blackwell) in 2005.

In 2007, Daub briefly ran for the U.S. Senate seat being vacated by Senator Chuck Hagel; he exited the race to offer an early endorsement to Mike Johanns, former Nebraska governor and USDA secretary, who won the seat.

In 2008, Daub announced he was running again for Mayor of Omaha in the 2009 election. In the April 2009 primary, he received the most votes; however, in the May 2009 runoff election, he lost to Jim Suttle, with unofficial final results of 48.7% to 50.7%.  In that election, Democrats also gained control of the city council.

Daub served for five years on the board of Omaha's Metropolitan Entertainment and Convention Authority (MECA). In 2012, he was elected to the board of regents of the Nebraska University system. In 2018, he was defeated in his reelection bid by Barbara Weitz.

Currently, Daub is a member of the ReFormers Caucus of Issue One.

Controversy
As a University regent, Daub called for football players to be removed from the Nebraska Cornhuskers because they knelt during the national anthem in 2017 as a protest against police violence. Daub later denied having calling for the players' removal. Coach Mike Riley said that Daub's view of the protest as unpatriotic was a misinterpretation.

When senator Julie Slama reported in 2022 that she had been sexually assaulted by Charles Herbster, Daub remarked that he wanted to put Slama on a witness stand because "I'd like to ask her what she was wearing." He was publicly criticized for this, and for saying that Slama "was trying to attract Herbster's attention" at the gathering where she says she was assaulted.

References

External links

|-

|-

|-

1941 births
Living people
Mayors of Omaha, Nebraska
Military personnel from Nebraska
Nebraska lawyers
People from Fort Bragg, North Carolina
Republican Party members of the United States House of Representatives from Nebraska
United States Army soldiers
University of Nebraska College of Law alumni
Washington University in St. Louis alumni
Members of Congress who became lobbyists